Chernomorye is a rural locality (a village) in Mstyora Urban Settlement, Vyaznikovsky District, Vladimir Oblast, Russia. The population was 8 as of 2010.

Geography 
Chernomorye is located on the Tara River, 27 km northwest of Vyazniki (the district's administrative centre) by road. Ramenye is the nearest rural locality.

References 

Rural localities in Vyaznikovsky District